Alexandra Senter (née Tselios) is an Australian entrepreneur, social commentator and business columnist. She is the founder and CEO of opinion site The Big Smoke and the Tselios Media Group. Senter was noted in Business Insider for her entrepreneurship in Australia.

Career 
Alexandra Senter appears regularly on ABC TV including ABC's The Drum.

Senter is also the cofounder and Director of Jewish think tank +61J.

She writes a business column in CEO magazine and appears regularly as a commentator on nationwide radio in Australia, including 2GB, 2UE and ABC. She has been published in The Huffington Post, The Australian, The Age, The Sydney Morning Herald, News.com.au, The Daily Mail UK, Australian Financial Review, Business Insider, BRW, Management Today, mUmBRELLA, The Hoopla, Australasian Lawyer and Business First Magazine.

Personal life and Education 
In 2016, Alexandra Senter hired 82-year old Advertising executive Roger Pugh to lead a team of millennial staff.

Senter also has a Masters of Business Management.

References

Australian business and financial journalists
Living people
Year of birth missing (living people)